Richard Hennessy (1724 — 8 October 1800) was an Irish military officer and businessman, best known for founding the Hennessy cognac dynasty, which is today a luxury brand and one of the most prominent in the world. Hennessy was from County Cork, Ireland, and, due to his Jacobite political tendencies, went into exile in France, eventually serving in the French Army.

Biography

Background and early life
Richard Hennessy was born in 1724 to James Hennessy and Catherine Barrett at Ballymacmoy House, Killavullen, a small village on the Blackwater river, in County Cork, Ireland. His paternal family were of Gaelic Irish stock; the Hennessys were anciently of the Laighin and claimed descent from a junior branch of the O'Dempsey family. Specifically with Richard's family, his family were able to restore themselves to a level of prominence through his grandfather's marriage to a daughter of the Norman descended Sir Richard Nagle.

Growing up an Irish Catholic to a family of some ambition, in the aftermath of the Revolution of 1688, whereby Anglo-Protestant hegemony was operative in Ireland, the young Richard Hennessy at the age of 19 elected to leave the country for Bourbon France. Here he joined the Clare Regiment of the Irish Brigade in the French Army, serving as an officer. This was in the service of king Louis XV of France. Shortly after the Battle of Fontenoy in 1745 he became familiar with the Charente region, famous for its cognac production. Using money he had earned in his military career, he decided to become involved in cognac investment from afar, without much success initially.

Hennessy cognac production
Richard Hennessy and his cousin James Hennessy went to Ostend in Flanders in 1757 to learn how to trade. Upon returning to France in 1765 he decided to settle in the Charente area permanently with his wife Ellen Barrett (an aunt of the political philosopher Edmund Burke) and their son Jacques Hennessy (11 October 1765 – 22 April 1843). With the assistance of some of the banking houses in Paris, he and two business partners by the name of Connelly and Arthur began trading in cognac from his house.

During this time the trade in alcoholic spirits were booming, popular not only with French customers, but also with foreigners, especially people from the British Empire showing interest, leading to a massive boom in cognac in the 1760s. Indeed, in Hennessy's homeland, the Kingdom of Ireland, spirits from the European Continent were popular, because customs duties were much lower than those imposed in the Kingdom of Great Britain. As well as this there was a shortage of rum due to the Seven Years' War and "implied that the growing taste for alcohol could only be satisfied by increased imports."

Hennessy expanded his customer base by shipping the product from Cognac to London, Dublin and Flanders. He also had clients at the Court of the King of France, such as the Prince of Soubise, familiar with the Charente. However, the Hennessy House was still of negligible importance in the 1770s, and Richard Hennessy left the city in 1776 to settle in Bordeaux, where he had associates, as a distiller, in association with alderman George Boyd. It was only in the context of the revolutionary decade that "the Hennessy, until then a minor house, reached the rank of great." Two marriage covenants with an older and firmly established house, the Martells, allowed and endorsed both this promotion in the last decade of the century.

See also
Arthur Guinness
Jean Martell

References
Le Choix de Cognac : l'établissement des négociants irlandais en eau-de-vie au XVIIIe siècle, by Louis Cullen
La naissance d'une dynastie du cognac Richard Hennessy 1727–1800, by Monique le Tac
Les Réfugiés jacobites dans la France du XVIIIe siècle, by Patric Clarke de Dromantin
Archives de la Maison Hennessy

External links
 Richard Hennessy at Peerage.com
 "Hennessy, Richard" at Oxford Dictionary of National Biography
 Richard Hennessy, founder and visionary at Hennessy.com

1724 births
1800 deaths
18th-century Irish people
Irish businesspeople
Irish Jacobites
Irish soldiers
Irish emigrants to France
Irish soldiers in the French Army
People from County Cork
Cognac
Wild Geese (soldiers)
Hennessy family